Ernst Hjalmar Karlsson (1 March 1906 – 2 April 1992) was a Swedish sailor. He was a crew member of the Swedish boat Rush V that won the gold medal in the 5.5 m class at the 1956 Summer Olympics. His sons Arne and Per-Olof also became Olympic sailors.

References

External links
 
 
 

1906 births
1992 deaths
Swedish male sailors (sport)
Sailors at the 1956 Summer Olympics – 5.5 Metre
Olympic sailors of Sweden
Olympic gold medalists for Sweden
Olympic medalists in sailing
Royal Swedish Yacht Club sailors

Medalists at the 1956 Summer Olympics
Sportspeople from Örebro